Vinnie Maria Vermeer (born 2 July 1995) is a Dutch footballer who plays as a midfielder. He most recently played for Eerste Divisie club FC Eindhoven.

Club career 
He made his professional debut in the Eerste Divisie for FC Eindhoven on 28 January 2012 in a game against SC Veendam.

Vermeer signed with NAC Breda in September 2014. After six months without playing, he moved to Deportivo Azogues, playing in Ecuadorian Serie B. He returned to NAC in June 2016 and signed a contract there until mid-2019. In the summer of 2017, he was sent on a six-month loan deal to FC Oss. In January 2018, it was announced that Vermeer would finish the season on loan at Tweede Divisie club TEC. Vermeer returned to NAC Breda after his loan period in July 2018.

On 18 January 2019, NAC Breda announced that Vermeer's contract had been mutually terminated to allow him to go on trial with Nashville SC of the USL. On 22 February 2019, Nashville SC announced they had signed Vermeer to a permanent contract following a successful period on trial with the club. On 3 July 2019, Nashville SC announced that they had loaned Vermeer to Las Vegas Lights FC for the rest of the 2019 season. He was recalled from his loan by Nashville a week later, but returned to Las Vegas on loan on 1 August.

Vermeer moved back to the Netherlands on 27 August 2020, signing with his former team FC Eindhoven after an absence of six years. He already left Eindhoven again on 10 November, due to lacking perspectives of playing time.

Personal life 
Born in the Netherlands is of Indonesian, and Surinamese descent.

References

External links 
 
 

1995 births
Footballers from Tilburg
Living people
Dutch footballers
Dutch people of Indonesian descent
Dutch sportspeople of Surinamese descent
FC Eindhoven players
NAC Breda players
TOP Oss players
SV TEC players
Nashville SC (2018–19) players
Las Vegas Lights FC players
USL Championship players
Eredivisie players
Eerste Divisie players
Deportivo Azogues footballers
Dutch expatriate footballers
Expatriate footballers in Ecuador
Association football midfielders
Ecuadorian Serie B players
Tweede Divisie players
Dutch expatriate sportspeople in Ecuador
Dutch expatriate sportspeople in the United States